The Player (formerly known as Endgame) is an American action thriller crime drama television series created by John Rogers and John Fox, starring Philip Winchester, Wesley Snipes and Charity Wakefield. NBC ordered the pilot to series on May 8, 2015, and the show aired from September 24, to November 19, 2015 for one season. Because of low ratings, the count of episodes was reduced to nine (thirteen had originally been ordered), with the production wrapping up after shooting the ninth episode. Before that, Sony sold the series' airing rights to 105 international territories.

Premise
The life of Alex Kane (Phillip Winchester), a security expert in Las Vegas, is turned upside down during an evening with his ex-wife Ginny, as she is killed by unknown assailants. Eager to track down Ginny's murderers, Kane runs into a high-stakes gambling operation run by Isaiah Johnson (Wesley Snipes), the "Pit Boss", and Cassandra King (Charity Wakefield), the "Dealer". Johnson and King organize betting on crimes, pitting a "Player" against criminals. King helps the Player with almost unlimited resources as the punters bet on who will gain the upper hand over a limited timeframe. Kane is recruited as the organization's latest Player.

Cast

Main
 Philip Winchester as Alex Kane, "The Player"
 Charity Wakefield as Cassandra King, the dealer
 Damon Gupton as Detective Cal Brown, Las Vegas Police Department
 Wesley Snipes as Mr. Isaiah Johnson, the pit boss

Recurring
 Daisy Betts as Virginia "Ginny" Lee, Alex's ex-wife
 Nick Wechsler as Nick, Cassandra's boyfriend
 Richard Roundtree as Judge Samuel Letts
 KaDee Strickland as  Special Agent Rose Nolan
 Courtney Grosbeck as Dani, Alex's niece

Broadcast
In Australia, the series premiered on October 7, 2015 on the Seven Network. In Spain, the series premiered on December 7, 2015 on the AXN. In the United Kingdom, the series premiered on October 21, 2016 on Spike. In Mexico, the series premiered on March 1, 2019 on Azteca 7.

Episodes

Reception

Rotten Tomatoes assessed the series' approval rating at 38%, with an average rating of 4.1/10, sampled from 45 reviews. Their critic consensus states: "The Players convoluted premise weighs down a game cast, bringing nothing original to the table". On Metacritic, it holds a 43 out of 100, based on 25 critics' reviews, signifying "mixed or average reviews".

Ratings

References

External links
 
 

2010s American crime drama television series
2015 American television series debuts
2015 American television series endings
American action television series
English-language television shows
NBC original programming
Television series by Sony Pictures Television
Television series by Universal Television
Television shows set in the Las Vegas Valley
Fictional portrayals of the Las Vegas Metropolitan Police Department
Crime thriller television series